Christian Gottlieb Ferdinand Ritter von Hochstetter (30 April 1829 – 18 July 1884) was a German-Austrian geologist.

Career 
Having received his early education at the evangelical seminary at Maulbronn, Ferdinand proceeded to the University of Tübingen and the Tübinger Stift; there, under Friedrich August von Quenstedt, the interest he already felt in geology became permanently fixed, and he obtained his doctor's degree and a travelling scholarship.

In 1852 he joined the staff of the Imperial Geological Survey of Austria and was engaged until 1856 in parts of Bohemia, especially in the Bohemian Forest, and in the Fichtel Hills and Karlsbad mountains. His excellent reports established his reputation. Thus he came to be chosen as geologist to the Novara expedition (1857–59), and made numerous valuable observations in the voyage round the world.

The Novara arrived in New Zealand on 22 December 1858. Almost immediately he met the German scientist Julius von Haast who had also recently arrived in New Zealand, with whom he formed a lifelong friendship. Polymath Arthur Purchas convinced von Hochstetter to stay in New Zealand, where he spent the next nine months of his life. In 1859, Ferdinand was employed by the government of New Zealand to make a first geological survey of the islands. His survey of old Lake Rotomahana and the Pink and White Terraces provides the only primary evidence of the Terrace locations today. Between 2016 and 2020, his survey diary was reverse engineered to provide the coordinates of the Pink, Black and White Terraces. On his return he was appointed in 1860 professor of mineralogy and geology at the Imperial-Royal Polytechnic Institute in Vienna; from 1874 to 1875 he was the rector there.

His analysis of the tsunami generated by the 1868 Arica (Peru) earthquake is well known for its contribution to understanding of tsunami propagation. The resulting tsunami caused damaging surges in a number of regions in the Pacific region, including fatalities on the Chatham Islands. Von Hochstetter, charted the trajectory of the event throughout the Pacific. This also enabled an estimate of the depth of the Pacific Ocean to be calculated.

In 1872 he became the natural history tutor of Rudolf, Crown Prince of Austria.  In 1876 he was made superintendent of the Imperial Natural History Museum. In these later years he explored portions of Turkey and eastern Russia, and he published papers on a variety of geological, palaeontological and mineralogical subjects.

In 1869, he was elected as a member to the American Philosophical Society and in 1884 was granted a hereditary knighthood by the Emperor of Austria.

Detailed descriptions in his diaries were helpful in 2011, when researchers managed to locate the silica terraces on Lake Rotomahana, which was buried in the 1886 eruption of Mount Tarawera.

Personal life
He was born at Esslingen, Württemberg, the son of Christian Ferdinand Friedrich Hochstetter (1787–1860) and his second wife, Sophie Orth. Christian Ferdinand was a clergyman and Professor at Bonn, who was also a botanist and mineralogist. In 1861 von Hochstetter married Georgiana Bengough, daughter of John Egbert Bengough, an Englishman who was director of the Vienna city gasworks. They went on to have eight children.  A good deal is known of his personal life through his documented correspondence with friend and colleague Julius von Haast He died in Oberdöbling near Vienna, at age 55 from complications of diabetes.

Legacy
The Geoscience Society of New Zealand hold an annual lecture named in von Hochstetter's honour.

Taxonomy
New Zealand's endemic Hochstetter's frog, Leiopelma hochstetteri, is named after Ferdinand. Several other species bear his name in their scientific names, including the Takahe, Porphyrio hochstetteri, and Powelliphanta hochstetteri, a species (with five subspecies) of New Zealand's giant carnivorous land snails.

Geography
Hochstetter Peak on Trinity Peninsula in Antarctica is named after Hochstetter, as are New Zealand's Mount Hochstetter (West Coast Region), Lake Hochstetter and the Hochstetter Dome and Hochstetter Icefall close to the Tasman Glacier.

Geology
The rock type dunite was named by Ferdinand von Hochstetter in 1859, after Dun Mountain near Nelson, New Zealand.

Publications
 Karlsbad, seine geognostischen Verhältnisse und seine Quellen (1858)
 Neu-Seeland (1863); published in English as  
 Geological and Topographical Atlas of New Zealand (1864)
 The geology of New Zealand: in explanation of the geographical and topographical atlas of New Zealand (1864) 
 Über das Erdbeben in Peru am 13. August 1868 und die dadurch veranlassten Fluthwellen im Pacifischen Ocean, namentlich an den Küsten von Chili und von Neu-Seeland (1868).
 Leitfaden der Mineralogie and Geologie'' (with A Bisching) (1876, ed. 8, 1890).

See also
 European and American voyages of scientific exploration

Notes

References

External links
 
 
 Teara.govt.nz: Te Ara biography of Ferdinand von Hochstetter
 Teara.govt.nz: Te Ara article "Ferdinand von Hochstetter" (1966)
 Michaelorgan.org.au: Ferdinand von Hochstetter and the Austrian Novara Scientific Expedition 1858-9

19th-century Austrian geologists
19th-century German geologists
1829 births
1884 deaths
Academic staff of TU Wien
University of Tübingen alumni
Austrian knights
People from the Kingdom of Württemberg
People from Esslingen am Neckar